"Woman of the World (Leave My World Alone)' is a 1969 single written by Sharon Higgins,  and recorded by Loretta Lynn.  The single was from the LP Woman of the World / To Make a Man and was Loretta Lynn's third number one on the country charts. The single spent one week at the top and a total of 15 weeks on the chart.

Chart performance

References

1969 singles
Loretta Lynn songs
Song recordings produced by Owen Bradley
Decca Records singles
1969 songs